Proto-Athabaskan is the reconstructed ancestor of the Athabaskan languages.

Phonology

The reconstruction of Proto-Athabaskan phonology is still under active debate. This section attempts to summarize the less controversial parts of the Proto-Athabaskan sound system.

Symbols

As with many linguists working on Native American languages, Athabaskanists tend to use an Americanist phonetic notation system rather than IPA. Although some Athabaskanists prefer IPA symbols today, the weight of tradition is particularly heavy in historical and comparative linguistics, hence the Americanist symbols are still in common use for descriptions of Proto-Athabaskan and in comparisons between members of the family. In the tables in this section, the proto-phonemes are given in their conventional Athabaskanist forms with IPA equivalents following in square brackets.

Since transcription practices in Americanist phonetic notation are not formally standardized, there are different symbols in use for the same sounds, a proliferation partly due to changes in typefaces and computing technology. In the following tables, the older symbols are given first with newer symbols following. Not all linguists adopt the newer symbols at once, although there are obvious trends, such as the adoption of belted ɬ instead of barred ł, and the use of digraphs for affricates which is standard today for the laterals but not fully adopted for the dorsals. In particular, the symbols c, λ, and ƛ are rare in most publications today. The use of the combining comma above as in c̓ has also been completely abandoned in the last few decades in favor of the modifier letter apostrophe as in cʼ. Republication of older materials may preserve older symbols for accuracy, although they are no longer used, e.g. Krauss 2005, which was previously an unpublished manuscript dating from 1979.

It is crucial to recognize that the symbols conventionally used to represent voiced stops and affricates are actually used in the Athabaskan literature to represent unaspirated stops and affricates in contrast to the aspirated ones. This convention is also found in all Athabaskan orthographies since true voiced stops and affricates are rare in the family, and unknown in the proto-language.

Consonant reconstruction

The traditional reconstruction of the Proto-Athabaskan sound system consists of 45 consonants (Cook 1981; Krauss & Golla 1981; Krauss & Leer 1981; Cook & Rice 1989), as detailed in the following table.

First person singular fricative

A peculiar proto-phoneme in Proto-Athabaskan is the sound that Krauss (1976b) represents as *$, and which Leer (2005:284) has represented as *šʸ though lately he has since returned to *$ (e.g. Leer 2008). This is the phoneme found in Proto-Athabaskan, Proto-Athabaskan–Eyak, and Proto-Na-Dene that occurs in various reflexes of the first person singular pronoun. In Athabaskan languages, it usually has a reflex of /š/, the alveolar fricative, but in Eyak it appears as /x/ and in Tlingit as /χ/. Peculiarly, in Kwalhioqua-Tlatskanai, it seems to have been /x/ in at least some forms of the first-person-subject verb prefix (Krauss 1976b). It does not correspond well with other fricatives, a situation that led Krauss to considering it as unique. This proto-phoneme is not given in the table above, but is always assumed to be somehow a part of the Proto-Athabaskan inventory.

New consonant reconstruction

A newer reconstruction by Leer (2005:284) constitutes a significant reorganization of the system. Velars are reinterpreted as palatals, labialized postalveolar affricates are reinterpreted as retroflex consonants, and other labialized consonants are removed. In addition, the clear assertion is made that stops and affricates are phonologically the same class, although they may be articulated somewhat differently. Leer also adopted the argument advanced by Keren Rice (1997) that there was no need to distinguish between *y and *žʸ. The resulting system is somewhat simpler than the traditional one, with 8 fewer phonemes.

The asymmetric lack of retroflex fricatives in the Proto-Athabaskan inventory appears as a surprising gap, but Leer argued against them being distinguished from *š and *ž: "In my reconstruction, PA lacked distinctively reflexed *šʳ and *žʳ as opposed to plain *š and *ž". Although Leer (2005) did not include *ʔ and *h in his list of reconstructed consonants, those two proto-phonemes nevertheless appear in a variety of reconstructions in the same article and hence it can be assumed that they are indeed part of his proto-phoneme inventory.

Vowel reconstruction

Leer (2005:284) also offered a vowel system consisting of four long or full vowels and three short or reduced vowels which are more centralized.

The following table is adapted from Leer 2005 (p. 286) and shows the vowel correspondences between Proto-Athabaskan and the better documented Athabaskan languages.

Tone

The reconstruction of tone is an issue of major importance in Athabaskan language studies, as well as for the wider historical linguistics field. The possibility of a reconstructable tone system was first proposed by Edward Sapir, although it took around a half-century for his ideas to be realized into a coherent system. Michael Krauss's unpublished manuscript on Athabaskan tone (1979) circulated for decades before being published (2005), and has become the basis for all discussion of Athabaskan tonology. Krauss gives a detailed history of the work on Athabaskan tonology which is briefly summarized here.

The early work on Athabaskan languages ignored the existence of phonemic tone. Father Adrien-Gabriel Morice was the first linguist to describe tone for an Athabaskan language, specifically for Carrier, in 1891. Sapir's first fieldwork on Athabaskan languages was with Chasta Costa and Kato, both Pacific Coast Athabaskan languages that lack tone. He encountered tone in Tlingit in 1914 when working with Louis Shotridge, a student and consultant of Franz Boas, with whom Sapir described the minimal pair /qáːt/ "crippled" and /qaːt/ "sockeye salmon". He then encountered tone in Tsuut'ina (Sarcee) and gradually became convinced that Proto-Athabaskan must be reconstructed as a tonal language, although he was concerned by apparently contradictory findings in Gwich'in, Deg Hit'an, and Navajo. His student Fang-Kuei Li, whom Sapir described as "a very able Chinaman", had the benefit of speaking Mandarin Chinese and hence being well aware of tone. Sapir and Fang-Kuei Li investigated tone in several other Athabaskan languages, including Mattole, Wailaki, Hupa, Dëne Sųłiné (Chipewyan), and Hare. The problem that disturbed Sapir and others was that tone in Athabaskan languages does correspond, but in an unexpected and difficult to explain way.

It can be seen in the table above that the languages differ in how their tones correspond: the first three have low tone where the next three have high tone, and vice versa, with the last three lacking tone entirely. This issue puzzled linguists for some time. Both Li and Harry Hoijer both harbored suspicions that Proto-Athabaskan lacked tone entirely, but it took until 1964 when Michael Krauss published a paper in the International Journal of American Linguistics where he argued that Proto-Athabaskan instead had glottalization contrasts which developed independently into tones in the daughter languages or in some cases were lost. This argument was strengthened by data from Eyak which had a system of glottal modifications on vowels that corresponded well to Athabaskan tones, and furthermore by Jeff Leer's discovery of the Tongass dialect of Tlingit, which had a system closely corresponding that of Eyak.

The oppositions in tonal distribution are explained as an ahistorical division in Athabaskan languages whereby each language becomes either "high-marked", "low-marked", or "unmarked" for tone based on the Proto-Athabaskan reconstruction. The following table adapted from Rice & Hargus (2005:9) shows how the syllable codas of Proto-Athabaskan (PA) and the internal reconstruction of Pre-Proto-Athabaskan (PPA) correspond with those of the high-marked and low-marked languages.

In the above table, the symbol v represents a monomoraic reduced vowel, the VV represents a bimoraic full vowel, and the V a monomoraic full vowel in a syllable nucleus whose second mora is '. The R represents a sonorant, the S a fricative, the T a stop or affricate, and the ' a glottalization of the preceding segment. Note that nearly all languages that developed tone have also lost syllable-final ejectivity, retaining only the glottalized sonorants and bare glottal stops in that position. (Syllable initial ejective stops and affricates are of course retained.)

Morphology

Because obvious similarities in morphology are prevalent throughout all of the languages in the Athabaskan family, Proto-Athabaskan rejoices in an extensive reconstructed proto-morphology. All Athabaskan languages are morphologically complex and are commonly described as polysynthetic, thus it comes as no surprise that the proto-language is also morphologically complex.

Verb template

Keren Rice (2000) offers a "Pan-Athabaskan" verb template that characterizes the complexity of verb morphology in the proto-language and the daughter languages.

The actual verb template of Proto-Athabaskan has not been reconstructed yet, as noted by Vajda (2010:38). Nonetheless, Rice's generalization of the verb template based on various languages in the family is a reasonable approximation of what the structure of the Proto-Athabaskan verb might look like.

Rice's is probably the newest attempt at a Pan-Athabaskan template, but it is not the only one. Kibrik (1995) and Hoijer (1971) also proposed templates which generalized across a number of Athabaskan languages. Hoijer's proposal is missing several elements which were described in detail later, but Kibrik's is not terribly different from Rice's.

Kibrik only gives the zones rather than individual positions where the distinction matters. In addition, Kibrik did not give the domains and boundaries which have been added here for comparison.

A major distinction between the Kibrik and Rice versions is in the terminology, with Kibrik's "Standard Average Athabaskan" maintaining much of the traditional Athabaskanist terminology – still widely used – but Rice changing in favor of aspectual descriptions found in wider semantic and typological literature. The terminology in comparison:

 Rice (2000) "viewpoint aspect" = conventional "mode"
 Rice (2000) "situation aspect" = conventional "conjugation"
 Rice (2000) "subsituation aspect" ≈ Kibrik's "inceptive"

Kari (1989) offers a rigorous foundation for the position class system that makes up the verb template in Athabaskan languages. He defines a few terms and resurrects others which have since become standard in Athabaskanist literature.

 Position: a point or slot the verb template which hosts some number of morphemes which never cooccur. Some affixes may occur in multiple positions which are usually adjacent, but most morphemes are found in a single position. Kari (1989:435) gives the Ahtna ɣo- mode prefix and the s- qualifier as examples of multipositional morphemes.
 Floating position: a position which seems to move around depending on the appearance or lack of other morphemes in the verb. Kari cites the Ahtna third person plural subject pronominal q- as occurring in three different locations "under highly constrained conditions" (Kari 1989:435).
 Zone: a group of positions which are adjacent and semantically similar. Some previous descriptions of "position-subposition" are zones with positions within them (Kari 1989:435). The qualifiers are a type of zone, being made of at least two positions. The description by Krauss (1969) and Leer (2008) of the classifier as a three-morpheme sequence in Proto-Athabaskan technically makes the classifier a zone, but it is monomorphemic and often treated like a single position in the analysis of documented languages. Tlingit has a classifier approaching a zone although it is morphologically a single unit, and Eyak has a true classifier zone with two phonologically separate prefixes.
 Domain: an area of zones and positions which is grouped together as a phonological unit.
 Stem domain: a domain including the verb root and suffixes, and usually including the classifier.
 Conjunct domain: a domain spanning from the classifier (may or may not be included) leftward to the object prefixes.
 Disjunct domain: a domain spanning from the incorporated nouns to the preverbs, and not including any bound phrases that are considered to be word-external.
 Boundary: a morphological division between zones or domains. Each boundary has an associated conventional symbol. Not all researchers describe all the boundaries for every language, and it is not clear that there is total agreement on the existence of all boundaries.
 Disjunct boundary (#): the boundary between the disjunct and conjunct domains. Found in most Athabaskan descriptions.
 Qualifier-pronominal boundary (=/%): the boundary between the qualifiers and the outer pronominals (3 subjects, objects, etc.). Kari proposed using = but since that symbol is often used for clitics, many authors (e.g. Rice 2000) have used % instead.
 Conjugation-qualifier boundary (%): the boundary between the qualifiers and the conjugation prefixes. Not commonly used, especially with the loss of the % symbol to the qualifier-pronominal boundary.
 Stem boundary ([): the boundary between the inner pronominals (1 and 2 subject) and the classifier.

Kari (1989) and elsewhere uses + to indicate morpheme boundaries. This convention has been adopted by some Athabaskanists, but many others use the more common – instead. Another innovation from Kari is the use of angle brackets to mark epenthetic segments, a convention which is not often used even by Kari himself.

Classifier

The "classifier" is a verb prefix that occurs in all Athabaskan languages as well as the Tlingit and Eyak languages. It is, as Leer (1990:77) puts it, "the hallmark of Na-Dene languages". The classifier is found in no other language family, although may be present in the Yeniseian family per Vajda (2010). It is an obligatory prefix such that verbs do not exist without the classifier. Its function varies little from language to language, essentially serving as an indicator of (middle) voice and valence for the verb.

The name

The name "classifier" is confusing to non-Athabaskanists since it implies a classificatory function that is not obvious. Franz Boas first described it for Tlingit, saying "it is fairly clear that the primary function of these elements is a classificatory one" (Boas 1917:28), a not inaccurate statement given that it does enter into the classificatory verb system. Previously Edward Sapir had noted it in his seminal essay on the Na-Dene family, calling it a "'third modal element'" (Sapir 1915:540). He described it as indicating "such notions as transitive, intransitive, and passive" (id.), thus having voice and valency related functions. Once it was realized that the Tlingit and Athabaskan morphemes were functionally similar Boas's name for the Tlingit form was extended to the Athabaskan family. Unfortunately the classifier has only the vague remains of classificatory function in most Athabaskan languages, so in this family the name is opaque.

Because of the confusion that occurs from the use of the term "classifier", there have been a number of proposals for replacement terms. Andrej Kibrik (1993, 1996, 2001) has used the term "transitivity indicator" with the gloss abbreviation TI, Keren Rice (2000, 2009) has used "voice/valence prefix" abbreviated V/V, and for Tlingit Constance Naish and Gillian Story (1973:368–378) used "extensor". None of these alternatives has gained acceptance in the Athabaskan community, and Jeff Leer describes this situation:

Reconstruction

Jeff Leer (1990:93) offers an early reconstruction of the Proto-Athabaskan classifier. It is a portmanteau morpheme with two dimensions that are both phonological and functional. The one dimension is the "series", which surfaces as the presence or absence of a lateral fricative. The other dimension is the "D-effect", surfacing as the presence or absence of either vocalization or an alveolar stop.

Leer (2008:22) gives a newer, more complex reconstruction, which takes into account some rare correspondences with the Eyak yi- prefix. This Eyak form corresponds to a Proto-Athabaskan *nʸə- that is mostly lost.

See also
Proto-Dené–Caucasian language
Dené–Yeniseian languages

Bibliography

 California Indian Library Collections Project. California Athapaskan Bibliography
 Cook, Eung-Do. 1981. Athabaskan linguistics: Proto-Athapaskan phonology. Annual Review of Anthropology 10. 253–273.
 Cook, Eung-Do. 1992. Athabaskan languages. In William Bright (ed.), International encyclopedia of linguistics, 122–128. Oxford: Oxford University Press. .
 Cook, Eung-Do & Keren Rice. 1989. Introduction. In Eung-Do Cook & Keren Rice (eds.), Athapaskan linguistics: Current perspectives on a language family, 1–61. (Trends in Linguistics, State-of-the-art Reports 15). Berlin: Mouton de Gruyter. .
 
 Hoijer, Harry. 1938. The southern Athapaskan languages. American Anthropologist 40(1). 75–87.
 Hoijer, Harry. 1956. The Chronology of the Athapaskan languages. International Journal of American Linguistics 22(4). 219–232.
 Hoijer, Harry. 1963. The Athapaskan languages. In Harry Hoijer (ed.), Studies in the Athapaskan languages, 1–29. Berkeley: University of California Press.
 Hoijer, Harry (ed.). 1963. Studies in the Athapaskan languages. (University of California publications in linguistics 29). Berkeley: University of California Press.
 Hoijer, Harry. 1971. The position of the Apachean languages in the Athpaskan stock. In Keith H. Basso & M. E. Opler (eds.), Apachean culture history and ethnology, 3–6. (Anthropological papers of the University of Arizona 21). Tucson: University of Arizona Press.
 Hymes, Dell H. 1957. A note on Athapaskan glottochronology. International Journal of American Linguistics 23(4). 291–297.
 Kari, James. 1996. A Preliminary View of Hydronymic Districts in Northern Athabaskan Prehistory. Names 44:253-271.
 Kari, James. 2010. The concept of geolinguistic conservatism in Na-Dene prehistory . In The Dene–Yeniseian Connection. (Anthropological Papers of the University of Alaska). Vol. 5, new series. pp. 194–222.
 Kari, James, James A. Fall, & Shem Pete. 2003. Shem Pete's Alaska: The territory of the Upper Cook Inlet Denaʼina. Fairbanks, AK: University of Alaska Press.  (cloth);  (pbk.).
 Kari, James and Ben A. Potter. (2010). The Dene–Yeniseian Connection, ed. by J. Kari and B. Potter, 1–24. (Anthropological Papers of the University of Alaska), new series, vol. 5. Fairbanks: University of Alaska Fairbanks, Department of Anthropology.
 Kari, James and Ben A. Potter. (2010). The Dene-Yeniseian Connection: Bridging Asian and North America. In The Dene–Yeniseian Connection, ed. by J. Kari and B. Potter, 1–24. (Anthropological Papers of the University of Alaska), new series, vol. 5. Fairbanks: University of Alaska Fairbanks, Department of Anthropology, pp. 1–24.
 Krauss, Michael E. 1964. "The proto-Athapaskan–Eyak and the problem of Na-Dene, I: The phonology". International Journal of American Linguistics 30(2). 118–131.
 Krauss, Michael E. 1965. "The proto-Athapaskan–Eyak and the problem of Na-Dene, II: The morphology". International Journal of American Linguistics 31(1). 18–28.
 Krauss, Michael E. 1968. "Noun-classification systems in the Athapaskan, Eyak, Tlingit and Haida verbs". International Journal of American Linguistics 34(3). 194–203.
 Krauss, Michael E. 1969. On the classification in the Athapascan, Eyak, and the Tlingit verb. Baltimore: Waverly Press, Indiana University.
 Krauss, Michael E. 1973. Na-Dene. In Thomas A. Sebeok (ed.), Linguistics in North America, 903–978. (Current trends in linguistics 1.) The Hague: Mouton. (Reprinted as Krauss 1976.)
 Krauss, Michael E. 1976a." Na-Dene". In Thomas A. Sebeok (ed.), Native languages of the Americas, 283–358. New York: Plenum. Reprint of Krauss 1973.
 Krauss, Michael E. 1976b. Proto-Athabaskan–Eyak fricatives and the first person singular. Unpublished manuscript.
 Krauss, Michael E. 1979. "Na-Dene and Eskimo". In Lyle Campbell & Marianne Mithun (eds.), The languages of native America: Historical and comparative assessment. Austin: University of Texas Press.
 Krauss, Michael E. 1979. Athabaskan tone. Unpublished manuscript. Published with revisions as Krauss 2005.
 Krauss, Michael E. 1981. On the history and use of comparative Athapaskan linguistics. Unpublished manuscript.
 Krauss, Michael E. 1986. "Edward Sapir and Athabaskan linguistics". In W. Cowan, M. Foster, & K. Koerner (eds.), New perspectives in language, culture, and personality, 147–190. Amsterdam: Benjamins.
 Krauss, Michael E. 1987. The name Athabaskan. In Peter L. Corey (ed.), Faces, Voices & Dreams: A celebration of the centennial of the Sheldon Jackson Museum, Sitka, Alaska, 1888–1988, 105–08. Sitka, AK: Division of Alaska State Museums and the Friends of the Alaska State Museum. PDF version available from the Alaska Native Language Center.
 Krauss, Michael E. 2005. Athabaskan tone. In Sharon Hargus & Keren Rice (eds.), Athabaskan Prosody, 51–136. Amsterdam: John Benjamins. Revision of unpublished manuscript dated 1979.
 Krauss, Michael E. & Victor Golla. 1981. Northern Athapaskan languages. In J. Helm (ed.), Subarctic, 67–85. (Handbook of North American Indians 6). Washington, DC: Smithsonian Institution.
 Krauss, Michael E. & Jeff Leer. 1981. Athabaskan, Eyak, and Tlingit sonorants. (Alaska Native Language Center research papers 5). Fairbanks, AK: University of Alaska, Alaska Native Language Center.
 Leer, Jeff. 1979. Proto-Athabaskan verb stem variation I: Phonology. (Alaska Native Language Center research papers 1). Fairbanks, AK: Alaska Native Language Center.
 Leer, Jeff. 1982. Navajo and comparative Athabaskan stem list. Unpublished manuscript. ANLA CA965L1982
 Leer, Jeff. 1990. Tlingit: A portmanteau language family? In Philip Baldi (ed.), Linguistic change and reconstruction methodology, 73–98. (Trends in Linguistics: Studies and monographs 45). Berlin: Mouton de Gruyter. .
 Leer, Jeff. 2005. How stress shapes the stem-suffix complex in Athabaskan. In Sharon Hargus & Keren Rice (eds.), Athabaskan Prosody, 278–318. Amsterdam: John Benjamins.
 Leer, Jeff. 2008. Recent advances in AET comparison. ANLA CA965L2008b
 Leer, Jeff. 2010. The Palatal Series in Athabascan-Eyak-Tlingit, with an Overview of the Basic Sound Correspondences. In The Dene–Yeniseian Connection, ed. by J. Kari and B. Potter, p. 168-193. Anthropological Papers of the University of Alaska, new series, vol. 5. Fairbanks: University of Alaska Fairbanks, Department of Anthropology.
 Rice, Keren. 1997. "A reexamination of Proto-Athabaskan y". Anthropological Linguistics 39(3). 423–426.
 Rice, Keren. 2000. Morpheme order and semantic scope: Word formation in the Athapaskan verb. Cambridge: Cambridge University Press.  (hbk);  (pbk).
 Vajda, Edward. 2010. "A Siberian Link with Na-Dene Languages". In The Dene–Yeniseian Connection, ed. by J. Kari and B. Potter, 33–99. Anthropological Papers of the University of Alaska, new series, vol. 5. Fairbanks: University of Alaska Fairbanks, Department of Anthropology.
 Vajda, Edward J. (2011). Oxford Bibliographies Online: "Dene-Yeniseian".

Further reading

 
 Leer, Jeff. 1992. Na-La-Dene cognate sets. Item CA965L1992b. Ms. (March 17, 1992), Alaska Native Language Archive.
 Leer, Jeff. 1996. Comparative Athabaskan Lexicon. Item CA965L1996. Ms., Alaska Native Language Archive.
 Leer, Jeff. 2008. Recent advances in AET comparison. Paper prepared for the Dene-Yeniseian Symposium. Fairbanks, Feb. 26, 2008. Item CA965L2008b. Ms., Alaska Native Language Archive.
 Nikolayev, Sergei. 2013. Na-Dene reconstruction: state of the art. Comparative-Historical Linguistics of the XXIst Century: Issues and Perspectives. Institute for Oriental and Classical Studies, Russian State University for the Humanities. Moscow, March 20-22, 2013.

References

External links

 Pan-Dene Comparative Lexicon (PanDeneComPlex; formerly the Pan-Athapaskan Comparative Lexicon)
 Comparative Athabaskan Lexicon by Jeff Leer (University of Alaska Fairbanks)

Athabaskan
Athabaskan languages